Rixö is a locality situated in Lysekil Municipality, Västra Götaland County, Sweden. It had 357 inhabitants in 2010.

History 
The settlement grew up around the granite quarry and stonemasonry industry in the shore of Brofjorden. The industry was started on a German initiative and was run by Skandinaviska Granit AB in 1875–1964. Most of the stone was exported to Germany for the building of Autobahn; some went to Argentina and to various constructions in Sweden. As of 2018, only a small part of the quarry is in operation.

Geography 
In Brofjorden, opposite Rixö is Ryxö island, a designated nature reserve.

References

External links 

Populated places in Västra Götaland County
Populated places in Lysekil Municipality